Azneem Ahmed (born in Kulhudhuffushi) is a Maldivian sprinter. At the 2012 Summer Olympics, he competed in the 100 metres where he broke the national record with a time of 10.79 seconds in the heats before being eliminated in the first round. He also holds the national record in the 200 metres with 21.70 and the Men's 4 × 100 m Relay record with 41.39 seconds.

References

External links
 

1989 births
Living people
Maldivian male sprinters
Olympic athletes of the Maldives
Athletes (track and field) at the 2012 Summer Olympics
Athletes (track and field) at the 2010 Asian Games
Asian Games competitors for the Maldives
People from Kulhudhuffushi